
The Cahokia were an Algonquian-speaking Native American tribe and member of the Illinois Confederation; their territory was in what is now the Midwestern United States in North America. As a member of the Illinois Confederation, the Cahokia were likely similar to other Illinois groups in culture, economy, and technology. At the time of European contact with the Illini, the peoples were located in what would later be organized as the states of Illinois, Iowa, Missouri, and Arkansas. After coming upon a complex of monumental earthwork mounds in southern Illinois, the Europeans named the site Cahokia Mounds after the historic Cahokia tribe, then present in the vicinity. But scholars do not believe the tribe was related to the builders of Cahokia Mounds; the site had been abandoned by Native Americans for centuries. 

French missionaries built two missions as part of their proselytizing of the Cahokia: the Tamaroa/Cahokia mission in 1699 CE and the River L’Abbė mission in 1735 CE. These multiple missions imply the Cahokia was a large enough tribe for the French Seminary of Foreign Missions to justify their construction and operation. But the Cahokia declined in number in the 18th century, due likely to mortality from warfare with other tribes, new infectious diseases, and cultural changes, such as Christianization, which further disrupted their society.

The remnant Cahokia, along with the Michigamea, were absorbed by the Kaskaskia and finally the Peoria people. The Tamaroa were closely related to the Cahokia. After the U.S. government implemented its policy of Indian removal in the early nineteenth century,  they were forcefully relocated to Kansas Territory, and finally to Indian Territory (present-day Oklahoma). Five Cahokia chiefs and headmen joined those of other Illinois tribes at the 1818 Treaty of Edwardsville (Illinois); they ceded to the United States territory of theirs that equaled half of the present state of Illinois. 

Although the Cahokia tribe is no longer a distinct polity, its cultural traditions continue through the federally recognized Peoria Tribe of Indians of Oklahoma.

See also
Illinois Confederation

Further reading
 Cahokia Indian Tribe History at Access Genealogy

References

External links

Encyclopedia of Oklahoma History and Culture - Cahokia
Lenville J. Stelle, Inoca Ethnohistory Project: Eye Witness Descriptions of the Contact Generation, 1667 - 1700

Algonquian peoples
Illinois Confederation
Native American tribes in Illinois
Native American tribes in Iowa
Native American tribes in Missouri
Native American tribes in Arkansas
Native American tribes in Kansas
Native American tribes in Oklahoma
Algonquian ethnonyms
Cahokia